Brahmashri Narayana Guru Swamy is a Tulu Language film directed and produced by Rajashekhar Kotian under the banner of Thungabadra Films. Venkatadri has played the lead role of Brahmashri Narayana Guru and Vijaya Raghavendra in a supporting role. The film was released on 2 May 2014 at five theaters across Udupi and Mangalore.

Cast 

Venkatadri as Brahmashri Narayana Guru
Vijay Raghavendra
Rajshekar Kotian
Balakrishna Shetty
Suryodhaya
Abhayachandra Jain
Jaya C Suvarna
Umanath Kotian
Chandrashekar Suvarna
Ashok Karnad
Chandrakanth
Sudheer Kotary
Ranjith, Gagan
Aravind Bolar
Bojaraj Vamanjoor
Boomika
Navya
Chitra Suvarna
Ashwini
Poornima

References

External links
Moviebuff